Semra Eren-Nijhar (born April 6, 1967 in Istanbul) is a German-Turkish author, sociologist, documentary filmmaker and a social commentator.

Biography 
Eren-Nijhar is an expert in the area of social policy across Europe and Turkey mostly focusing on issues of migration, memory, belonging, heritage, women, youth, race, identity, and the Turkish diaspora in the EU.

She is the founder of the ‘Turkish Heritage in the UK’ initiative, jointy founded with Councillor Ahmet Karahasan of the "Turkish Heritage Day in London" – launched on December 8, 2014, at Enfield Council and as well the founder of the "Turkish Heritage in Europe" which was launched at the international Bosphorus Summit on November 29, 2019, in Istanbul.

For more than fifteen years Eren-Nijhar researched the archives of the Cyprus Turkish Association CTA (first Turkish association in Britain) and is the first and only researcher who introduced some selected documents, photos, and publications of the archives to the wider public.

Her work London Turks – In Their Own Words which chronicles the Turkish community over the last seventy years with photographs, interviews, and portraits in the UK was the first major work on the Turkish diaspora in Britain and was exhibited and acknowledged by the Greater London Authority, Mayor of London in 2006 and later in 2007 at the European Parliament acknowledged and hosted by MEP's Claude Moraes, Cem Özdemir, Emine Bozkurt and Vural Öger with the attendance of the Ambassador Volkan Bozkır, the Permanent Representative of Turkey to the European Union.

She is an expert on the twice Nobel Prize nominee Turkish Cypriot poet Osman Türkay and has enabled his work to come to life once again in Europe and in Turkey.
 
Eren-Nijhar worked for several years in the House of Lords as an adviser to a peer, Lord Tarsem King, Baron King of West Bromwich. The documentary "Söz Bizde – We Have the Voice", co-produced and directed with Ersin Atlı in 2010 was shown by Turkey's national broadcaster TRT and was the first documentary giving a voice to young people living in Britain and in Europe with Turkish and Kurdish background.
 
Eren-Nijhar is using creative techniques from the world of arts by drawing in people's interest in her sociological research outcomes and findings. She has exhibited her photographic exhibitions in Britain, Belgium, and Turkey. Her work mainly focuses on portraits of individuals.

Eren-Nijhar’s photographic exhibition “My Journey from Güvercinlik (Pigeon-loft)” was invited in 2017 to exhibit at the Victoria and Albert Museum (V&A) in during the marking of the British Turkish Cypriot community 100 years of migration to the United Kingdom. It was the first major photographic exhibition held at the Victoria and Albert Museum featuring the Turkish Cypriot community in Britain.

Books 
 Evrenin Şairi Osman Türkay, Cyprus Turkish Association Publications, 2011
 Avrupa’nın İlk Türk Derneği – Kıbrıs Türk Cemiyeti, Cyprus Turkish Association Publications, 2012
 Kıpırtı Yazıları, Yar Publishing, 2013
 Artık Gurbet Yok! (Mu?) I – There Is No More a Place far from Home! (Is There?), Ozan Publication, 2014 
 Turkish Heritage in the UK, SUNCUT Publishing, 2014 
 Londra’da Çok Kültürlülük – Yaşamdan Portreler, Ozan Publication, 2015 
 Artık Gurbet Yok! ( Mu?) II – Das Gefühl in der Fremde zu sein gibt es nicht mehr! (Oder?), Ozan Publication, 2016
 Turks in London-The Unheard Voices, Ozan Publication, 2017
 Kadınlardan Dünyayı Değiştiren Sözler, Ozan Publication, 2018
 Londra mı Dediniz? Buyrun..., Ozan Publication, 2019
 Osman Turkay

Awards 
 2004 – Millennium Awards Fellowship, Lifetime Membership for her personal commitment and achievement enriching the community throughout the United Kingdom. 
 2015 – International European Quality Award, Innovation and Awareness Award for her outstanding achievement in her work.
 2018 – Achievement Award for her outstanding achievement in her work.

References

External links 
 Söz Bizde – We Have the Voice
 
 
 
 

 Photographic exhibitions in Britain
 Exhibition about Turkish migrant women in London coming to Waltham Forest
 Semra Eren Nijhar'dan 'Artık Gurbet Yok' sergisi
 Semra Eren Nijhar’dan ‘Gurbet Yolculuğu’

 Photographic exhibitions in Turkey
 Kaş'ta 'Beş Kadın Beş Sergi' Açıldı
 Beş kadın beş sergi Yeşilköy beldesinde düzenlenen 3. Köy Seyirlik Oyunları ve Köy Tiyatroları Buluşması çerçevesinde 5 kadın sanatçı sergi açtı.

 Turkish Heritage in Europe
 Türkiye Cumhurbaşkanlığı himayelerinde 27–29 Kasım arasında organize edilen 10.Bogaziçi Zirvesi’nde bu yıl ilk defa ‘Turkish Heritage in Europe – Avrupa’da Türklerin Politik, Ekonomik ve Tarihsel Mirası’ konulu panel düzenlendi ve Avrupa’da yaşayan Türklerin tarihsel konumu ele alınarak, konu ilk defa uluslararsı platformda tartışılmış oldu.
 Semra Eren Nijhar; Avrupa’da Türklerin Tarihsel Mirası

 London Turkish Heritage Day
 Kurduğu güçlü kadrosuyla Türk Ligi 1.Küme’nin en büyük favorisi Dumlupınar, sahasında konuk ettiği Doğan TB’yi 4-1 yenerek, rakibine ilk yenilgisini tattırırken, zirveden de indirdi.
 Boris Johnson backs new London Turkish Heritage Day
 London Turkish Heritage Day, Enfield
 ‘Biz Londralıyız’

1967 births
Living people
Turkish writers
Turkish women writers
Turkish sociologists
Turkish women sociologists